Marieke van Witzenburg-de Groot (born 29 October 1985) is a Dutch professional racing cyclist, who currently rides for UCI Women's Continental Team . In October 2020, she rode in the women's edition of the 2020 Liège–Bastogne–Liège race in Belgium.

References

External links

1985 births
Living people
Dutch female cyclists
Place of birth missing (living people)
People from Spijkenisse
Cyclists from South Holland